Vladislav Konstantinovich Sarveli (born 1 October 1997) is a Russian football player who plays for PFC Sochi. He plays as centre forward or second striker.

Club career
He made his professional debut in the Russian Professional Football League for FC Chertanovo Moscow on 25 July 2014 in a game against FC Tambov. He made his Russian Football National League debut for Chertanovo on 17 July 2018 in a game against FC Rotor Volgograd.

On 21 May 2021, he scored the only goal by PFC Krylia Sovetov Samara in a 2021 Russian Cup Final, which Krylia Sovetov eventually lost to FC Lokomotiv Moscow with a score of 1–3.

He made his Russian Premier League debut for PFC Krylia Sovetov Samara on 25 July 2021 in a game against FC Akhmat Grozny and scored his team's goal in a 1–2 loss.

On 24 June 2022, Sarveli signed with PFC Sochi.

International career
Sarveli was called up to the Russia national football team for the first time for a training camp in March 2022, at the time of Russia's suspension from international football.

Personal life
The origins of his last name are uncertain, his father believed that his family has Italian ancestry and his grandmother thought the name is of Georgian origin. Vladislav considers himself Russian.

Career statistics

References

External links
 
 
 
 

1997 births
People from Bolshoy Kamen
Sportspeople from Primorsky Krai
Russian sportspeople of Georgian descent
Russian people of Italian descent
Living people
Russian footballers
Association football forwards
FC Chertanovo Moscow players
PFC Krylia Sovetov Samara players
PFC Sochi players
Russian Premier League players
Russian First League players
Russian Second League players